Equitable Life Building may refer to:
 Equitable Life Building (Los Angeles)
 Equitable Life Building (Manhattan)
 Equitable Life Building (San Francisco) or 100 Montgomery Street

See also
 Equitable Building (disambiguation)